The 1924 Boston Braves season was the 54th season of the franchise. The Braves finished eighth place in the National League with a record of 53 wins and 100 losses.

Offseason 
 December 15, 1923: Hod Ford and Ray Powell were traded by the Braves to the Philadelphia Phillies for Cotton Tierney. Ray Powell reported to his new team with a bad leg in April 1924, and he was sent back to Boston under the terms of the trade agreement. The Braves sent cash to the Phillies to complete the trade.

Regular season

Season standings

Record vs. opponents

Roster

Player stats

Batting

Starters by position 
Note: Pos = Position; G = Games played; AB = At bats; H = Hits; Avg. = Batting average; HR = Home runs; RBI = Runs batted in

Other batters 
Note: G = Games played; AB = At bats; H = Hits; Avg. = Batting average; HR = Home runs; RBI = Runs batted in

Pitching

Starting pitchers 
Note: G = Games pitched; IP = Innings pitched; W = Wins; L = Losses; ERA = Earned run average; SO = Strikeouts

Other pitchers 
Note: G = Games pitched; IP = Innings pitched; W = Wins; L = Losses; ERA = Earned run average; SO = Strikeouts

Relief pitchers 
Note: G = Games pitched; W = Wins; L = Losses; SV = Saves; ERA = Earned run average; SO = Strikeouts

References

External links
1924 Boston Braves season at Baseball Reference

Boston Braves seasons
Boston Braves
Boston Braves
1920s in Boston